Liu Shaoxian (July 1940 – 8 October 2009) was a Chinese politician of Yi ethnicity who served as governor of Liangshan Yi Autonomous Prefecture from 1983 to 1991 and party secretary from 1990 to 1995. He was a delegate to the 7th National People's Congress. He was a member of the Standing Committee of the 10th Chinese People's Political Consultative Conference.

Biography
Liu was born in Mianning County, Sichuan, in July 1940, and graduated from Central University for Nationalities in 1966. He joined the Chinese Communist Party (CCP) in November 1960, and entered the workforce in September 1966. 

Liu worked in Muli Tibetan Autonomous County from May 1975 to April 1980. Starting in April 1980, he served in several posts in Yanyuan County, including deputy party secretary, party secretary, and chairman of its People's Congress. He was appointed deputy party secretary of Liangshan Yi Autonomous Prefecture in August 1983, concurrently holding the governor position. He also served as party secretary, the top political position in the prefecture, from January 1990 to February 1995. In February 1995, he became vice chairman of the Sichuan Provincial Committee of the Chinese People's Political Consultative Conference, a post he kept until 2006. 

On 8 October 2009, he died in Chengdu, Sichuan, at the age of 69.

References

1940 births
2009 deaths
People from Mianning County
Yi people
Minzu University of China alumni
People's Republic of China politicians from Sichuan
Chinese Communist Party politicians from Sichuan
Members of the Standing Committee of the 10th Chinese People's Political Consultative Conference
Governors of Liangshan Yi Autonomous Prefecture
Delegates to the 7th National People's Congress